Voice of Thunder is a reggae album by Prince Far I, released by Trojan Records in 1981.

Track listing
All titles written by Michael Williams.
"Ten Commandments"
"Tribute to Bob Marley"
"Hold the Fort"
"Every Time I Hear the Word"
"Head of the Buccaneer"
"Shall Not Dwell in Wickedness"
"Give I Strength"
"Kingdom of God"
"Coming in from the Rock"
"Skinhead"

References

Prince Far I albums
1981 albums
Trojan Records albums